The finals competition of the women's 3 metre springboard synchronized was held on June 6, the fifth and last day of the 2010 FINA Diving World Cup.

Results

LEGEND

WDR = Withdrew

2010 FINA Diving World Cup